Calistus Ashhel Bruer (September 8, 1885 – October 1, 1949) was an American farmer and politician.

Bruer was born in Owego Township, Livingston County, Illinois. He went to Pontiac Township High School in Pontiac, Illinois and to Lake Forest University. Bruer was a farmer and stock raiser. He served as town clerk and supervisor for the Owego Township. Bruer was a Republican. He served in the Illinois House of Representatives from 1923 until his death in 1949. Bruer died from a heart attack at his home in Pontiac, Illinois.

Notes

External links

1885 births
1949 deaths
People from Livingston County, Illinois
Lake Forest College alumni
Farmers from Illinois
Republican Party members of the Illinois House of Representatives
20th-century American politicians